Kings of Chaos are a hard rock supergroup with international membership featuring a core lineup of drummer Matt Sorum, bassist Duff McKagan, and guitarist Gilby Clarke (all then formerly of Guns N' Roses), as well as a revolving appearances from members of Def Leppard, Deep Purple, Aerosmith and more. The group plays songs from all of these bands, and other classic rock covers. To date, they have only recorded and released one song, "Never Before", on the Deep Purple tribute, Re-Machined: A Tribute to Deep Purple's Machine Head.

History
The band was formerly known as the Rock N Roll All-Stars, which had a short tour of South America in 2012. Since their reincarnation as the Kings of Chaos, the band have played Australia's Stone Music Fest, four shows in South Africa, one show in the United States, and two in Central America.

The supergroup has previously stated that they would be releasing EPs in the future that would each contain 3 covers and an original track, but this has yet to happen.

The band always plays a setlist of songs from the bands of the members, and generally another few cover songs. Most prominent throughout are the Guns N' Roses classics, "Sweet Child o' Mine", "Paradise City" and "Welcome to the Jungle", Def Leppard's "Pour Some Sugar on Me" and Deep Purple's "Highway Star."

One of the significant points to the Kings of Chaos is that they at one point had 4 members of the 1993 version of Guns N' Roses, and 2 original members. At the time, this was a higher number than the then-current incarnation of Guns N' Roses itself. The core line-up however includes original GNR member, Duff McKagan, KOC founder Matt Sorum who played with GNR from 1990-1997, and Gilby Clarke, who played for GNR from 1991 to 1994.

On August 19, 2014, Kings of Chaos announced a 2014 South African Tour with two scheduled dates that included Robin Zander of Cheap Trick, Billy Gibbons of ZZ Top, Nuno Bettencourt of Extreme, and  Steven Tyler of Aerosmith as a special guest. They were not joined by longtime members Joe Elliott and Glenn Hughes who both had other side projects that they were working on.

On November 4, 2014, Kings of Chaos played at Classic Rock Roll of Honour Awards at the Avalon in Hollywood, with special guest Joe Perry. They were also joined on stage by Brian May.

On October 27, 2022, Sorum announced the band's debut album would be releasing digitally in the latter half of 2023 via AFM Records. Alongside the announcement, the band also released the single "Judgement Day".

Members
The band is not meant to have a permanent lineup, and has thus had its fair share of personnel changes.
At its core, playing every show with both the Kings of Chaos and Rock N Roll All-Stars, were the former Guns N' Roses members, Matt Sorum, Duff McKagan, and Gilby Clarke. This changed in December 2016 when Kings of Chaos played its first show without McKagan and Clarke.

Lineups

Timeline

References

American rock music groups
Musical groups established in 2012
Rock music supergroups
2012 establishments in the United States